Antonio Aakeel is an English actor, known for his leading role in the 2018 comedy film Eaten by Lions, for which he was named a Screen International Star of Tomorrow by Screen Daily. He also appeared in Tomb Raider and the BAFTA award-winning series Three Girls.

Early life 
Antonio Aakeel was born in Wolverhampton, England, and moved around the West Midlands as a child. He was inspired to pursue acting after being given a one-line role in a school nativity play and subsequently began acting in local theatre. He speaks Punjabi and Hindi.

Career

Film

Aakeel gained his first leading feature role in the film Eaten by Lions as Omar, a young man in search of his estranged father. The film had a wide cinematic release in April 2019 and also starred comedians Johnny Vegas, Jack Carroll and Asim Chaudhry.

Screen Daily announced Aakeel would be leading Abid Khan's debut feature Granada Nights as Ben, a heartbroken British tourist on a journey of hedonism and discovery in Granada, Spain.

He appeared opposite Oscar-winner Alicia Vikander in Warner Bros.' 2018 Tomb Raider reboot, directed by Roar Uthaug. 

In 2016, Aakeel was cast alongside Riz Ahmed and Billie Piper in the London crime thriller City of Tiny Lights directed by BAFTA winner Pete Travis. The film had its world premiere at the Toronto International Film Festival 2016 and released in UK cinemas April 2017.

Later that year, Aakeel landed a supporting role in The Hungry,  Film London's contemporary feature adaptation of Shakespeare's Titus Andronicus playing troubled brother to Life of Pi's Suraj Sharma. The Film premiered under special presentations at the 2017 Toronto International Film Festival.

In 2015, he appeared as Raza in feature film The Contract, written by David Marconi and directed by Nic Auerbach.

Aakeel starred as Nasir Baloch in the political short film The Line of Freedom, directed by David Whitney. The film depicts the true story of a murdered student rights activist and premiered at the Dubai International Film Festival. Upon its release, the film immediately met with controversy and was subsequently prohibited in Pakistan.

Television
Aakeel gained his first television role in the E4 series Skins. He then led an episode of BBC One's Moving On playing Mati, a young refugee whose leave to remain is revoked on his eighteenth birthday. Directed by Reece Dinsdale, the episode won 'Best Daytime Programme' at the Royal Television Society Awards in 2018.

In May 2017, he appeared in BBC One's three-part BAFTA winning drama Three Girls directed by Philippa Lowthorpe. In 2019, Aakeel appeared in two episodes of the Channel 4 drama series Ackley Bridge as Anwar Wazir. Later that year, Aakeel began portraying the recurring role of Rafael Hyland in the BBC One thriller series Dublin Murders.

Theatre

Aakeel was cast in the title role in the stage adaptation of Guantanamo Boy. The play ran at the Half Moon Theatre and toured nationally at Middle Temple Hall, Almeida Theatre, The Hat Factory, Mercury Theatre, Burnley Youth Theatre and The Drum Theatre. The Stage's Susan Elkin wrote Aakeel "is great as the distraught, anguished, terrified Khalid. The downhill spiral followed by the final return of a damaged-for-life boy to Rochdale is well handled too. He has a very expressive face."

In 2015, he played the lead role of Artie in Waiting for Garbo at the Crescent Theatre as part of the Birmingham Theatre Festival. Love Midlands Theatre reviewed the performance, commenting his "portrayal of a brash New Yorker falling apart is utterly convincing."

Antonio has also performed locally with Midlands based theatre company Round Midnight.

References

External links
 

Living people
Actors from Wolverhampton
British male film actors
British male actors of Indian descent
British male television actors
21st-century British male actors
British male stage actors
Year of birth missing (living people)